Giuseppe Maria Galanti (1743–1806) was an Italian historian and economist, in the Kingdom of Naples.

Life
Galanti was born in Santa Croce del Sannio, Molise.  He was a follower of Pietro Giannone and studied under Antonio Genovesi. While young he was influenced by independent-minded priests and came to hate feudalism; moving as a boy to Naples, he came to know the ideas of Gaetano Filangieri as well as those of Genovesi.

With the title Visitatore generale del Regno, he surveyed the state of the kingdom, and proposed agricultural and economic reforms. A critic of the top layers of Neapolitan society, he considered them too little interested in commerce.

Works

Elogio di Niccolò Machiavelli cittadino e segretario fiorentino. Con un Discorso intorno alla costituzione della Società ed al governo politico (1779)

Saggio sopra l' antica storia de' primi abitatori dell'Italia (1783)
 (Five volumes, 1786–1794).
Giornale di viaggio in Calabria (1792)

(critical edition, Maria Rosaria Pelizzari, 2000)
Memoria intorno allo stato dei Banchi (1799)
Testamento forense (1806)
Scritti sulla Calabria (critical edition, 1993)
Memorie storiche del mio tempo e altri scritti di natura autobiografica (1761-1806) (critical edition, 1996)
Pensieri vari e altri scritti della tarda maturità (critical edition, 2000)
Prospetto storico sulle vicende del genere umano (critical edition, 2000)

References
Sources

Further reading
 Corrado Rainone, Il pensiero economico di Giuseppe Maria Galanti: 1743-1806 (Rome, 1968)
 Augusto Placanica, Daniela Galdi, Libri e manoscritti di Giuseppe Maria Galanti (1998)
 Gentile Giulio, Amor della libertà e saperi di governo in Giuseppe Maria Galanti - Informazioni sul prodotto (2001)
 Mafrici M., Pelizzari M. R. (editors), Un illuminista ritrovato: Giuseppe Maria Galanti (2006) , 
 Ileana Del Bagno, Saggi di storia del diritto moderno (2007)

External links
 Righiottavo
 Brigantaggio

1743 births
1806 deaths
People from the Province of Benevento
Italian economists